My Lady of Hy-Brasil and Other Stories is a collection of horror short stories by Peter Tremayne.  It was first published in 1987 by Donald M. Grant, Publisher, Inc. in an edition of 800 copies, all of which were numbered and signed by the author and the artist.  Many of the stories originally appeared in the magazines Kadath, Eldritch Tales, Fantasy Tales, Fantasy Macabre and Weirdbook.

Contents
 Introduction
 "My Lady of Hy-Brasil"
 "The Hudolion"
 "The Hungry Grass"
 "The Singing Stone"
 "The Kelpie’s Mask"
 "The Imshee"

References

1987 short story collections
Horror short story collections
Works by Peter Berresford Ellis
Works published under a pseudonym
Donald M. Grant, Publisher books